The National Museum of World Culture opened in Gothenburg, Sweden, in 2004. It is a part of the public authority Swedish National Museums of World Cultures and builds on the collections of the former Göteborgs Etnografiska Museum that closed down in the year 2000. Its aim is to interpret the subject of world culture in an interdisciplinary way. The museum is situated next to the Universeum science centre and the amusement park Liseberg, and close to Korsvägen. 
"The museum interprets the concept of world culture in a dynamic and open-ended manner. On the one hand, various cultures are incorporating impulses from each other and becoming more alike. On the other hand, local, national, ethnic and gender differences are shaping much of that process. World culture is not only about communication, reciprocity, and interdependence, but the specificity, concretion and uniqueness of each and every individual." (From the background info on the museums homepage.)

The opening exhibitions of the museum were:
 No Name Fever: AIDS in the age of globalization
 Horizons: Voices from a global Africa
 Sister of Dreams: People and myths of the Orinoco
 Fred Wilson: Site unseen - Dwellings of the Demons
 390 m2 Spirituality

Architecture 

The cement and glass building, located on a slope leading up to the Liseberg amusement park, is graceful, compact and modernistic. Its four-storey glass atrium looks out on mountains and woods.

The exhibition halls are in the closed part of the building, facing Södra vägen road. The upper storeys hang freely  over a footpath.

The architects behind the museum, who were chosen after an international competition, were the French-Cuban-English couple Cécile Brisac and Edgar Gonzalez of Brisac Gonzalez Architects.

In December 2020, the  movement, a peoples movement against modernist architecture, voted the building the ugliest building in Gothenburg and the 12th ugliest building in Sweden.

Controversies 
In February 2005 the museum decided to remove the painting "Scène d'Amour" by Louzla Darabi. The painting was part of a temporary exhibition about HIV/AIDS, and depicted a man and a woman having sexual intercourse. The artist and the curator had received numerous death threats from Muslims saddened and frustrated over the Koran quotations which were featured in a corner of the painting. Some threats were telling the artist to "learn from the Netherlands", referring to the murder of van Gogh and threats against Hirsi Ali.

References

External links 
The Museum of World Culture
Brisac Gonzalez Architects
Virtual Collection of Masterpieces
Virtual tour of the Museum of World Culture provided by Google Arts & Culture

World
Anthropology museums
2004 establishments in Sweden
Museums established in 2004
Global studies
Cross-cultural studies